Theodor Körner, Edler von Siegringen (23 April 1873 – 4 January 1957) was an Austrian military officer and statesman of the Social Democratic Party of Austria. He served as President of Austria from 1951 to 1957 and as Mayor of Vienna from 1945 to 1951.

Early life 
As son of an officer of the Austro-Hungarian Army, he was born in Újszőny, Kingdom of Hungary (today part of Komárom, Hungary), as the second child of an Artillery Captain, later promoted to major Theodor Karl Körner, Edler von Siegringen (1828-1917) and his wife, Karoline Fousek (1849–1929). He had one older sister, Rosa Antonia (b. 1872) and one younger brother Richrad (1874-1915), who later became lieutenant colonel in the Austro-Hungarian Armed Forces during World War I. He was great nephew of poet Theodor Körner and was distantly related to Bertha von Suttner, through her mother, Sophie Wilhelmine von Körner (1815-1884), who was also related to the poet.

Biography 
In 1883–1888, Körner lived in Chrastava, where his father was born, and attended the elementary school there. From 1888, he attended the military school in Hranice, graduated at the head of his class as a pioneer from the Imperial and Royal Technical Military Academy, and became lieutenant in 1894. He served as an officer in Agram (today Zagreb, Croatia) and was promoted to major in 1904, in which year he became a member of the Austrian  staff. During World War I, he was an active commander on the Italian front. He resigned from his military career in 1924 as a General.

Always interested in politics, he joined the social democrats and became a member of parliament in 1924. He served as Chairman of the Federal Council of Austria between December 1933 and February 1934.

Körner was a member of the Technischer Ausschuss (Technical Committee) of the Republikanischer Schutzbund and, alongside Alexander Eifler, considered one of its two leading military strategists. As opposed to Eifler, who favored a more streamlined and classic military organization for the Social-Democratic paramilitary, Körner proposed a strategic outline utilizing guerilla warfare and mass action in the case of a civil war. Eifler was eventually able to assert his strategic views in his struggle with Körner, in the course of which Körner left the technical committee in 1930.

The civil war in Austria and the installation of the austro-fascist dictatorship under Engelbert Dollfuss ended Körner's career as a politician. He was arrested, like other members of his party, by the authoritarian government that banned all opposition parties and put their representatives into prison. During World War II, Körner was again imprisoned, this time by the Nazis.

After the war, in April 1945, Körner became Mayor of Vienna in the newly erected Second Republic. Körner was responsible for rebuilding and reconstructing Vienna, which was heavily destroyed due to the bombing during the war. After the death of Karl Renner, his party nominated Körner as candidate for the presidency, and Körner won the elections with slightly more than 51 percent of the votes. He therefore became the first President of Austria directly elected by the people. Körner died in Vienna, in office, the second consecutive President to do so.

Körner had a profound knowledge of military sciences and wrote about military theory. In Vienna, there is a street named after him, as is the Theodor Körner Prize, an Austrian award for science and art.

A motor vessel, the MS Theodor Körner was built in 1965 and currently operates on the Danube River as a "Bike & Boat" cruise ship, accommodating 135 passengers plus crew.

Awards 
 Honorary Doctorate at the Vienna University of Technology (1945)
 Honorary citizen of Vienna city (1948)
 Grand Cross special class of the Order of Merit of the Federal Republic of Germany  (1956)

References

Sources 
 Ilona Duczynska: (Hrsg. und kommentiert): Theodor Körner. Auf Vorposten. Ausgewählte Schriften 1928 - 1938. Europaverlag, Wien, 1977, 
 Thea Leitner: Körner aus der Nähe. Danubia Verlag, Wien, 1951.
 Eric C. Kollman: Militär und Politik. VERL.DF.GESCH.U.POL., Wien, 1973.
 Thea Leitner: Hühnerstall und Nobelball. 1938–1955. Leben in Krieg und Frieden. Ueberreuter, Wien, 2004,

External links 
  Theodor Körner
 
 Originalton  von Bürgermeister Körner (1951)
 Biographie in der Wiener Zeitung
 
 
 The Voice of Theodor Körner (in German) from the archive of the Österreichische Mediathek

1873 births
1957 deaths
Mayors of Vienna
Edlers of Austria
Presidents of Austria
Presidents of the Austrian Federal Council
Members of the Federal Council (Austria)
Social Democratic Party of Austria politicians
Hungarian-German people
Austrian people of Hungarian descent
Hungarian people of Czech descent
Austrian people of German Bohemian descent
People from Komárom
Burials at the Vienna Central Cemetery
Grand Crosses Special Class of the Order of Merit of the Federal Republic of Germany